The Morrill Land-Grant Acts are United States statutes that allowed for the creation of land-grant colleges in U.S. states using the proceeds from sales of federally-owned land, often obtained from indigenous tribes through treaty, cession, or seizure. The Morrill Act of 1862 (12 Stat. 503 (1862)  later codified as  et seq.) was enacted during the American Civil War, and the Morrill Act of 1890 (the Agricultural College Act of 1890 (later codified as  et seq.) expanded this model.

Passage of original bill

For 20 years prior to the first introduction of the bill in 1857, there was a political movement calling for the creation of agriculture colleges. The movement was led by Professor Jonathan Baldwin Turner of Illinois College. For example, the Michigan Constitution of 1850 called for the creation of an "agricultural school", though it was not until February 12, 1855, that Michigan Governor Kinsley S. Bingham signed a bill establishing the United States' first agriculture college, the Agricultural College of the State of Michigan, known today as Michigan State University, which served as a model for the Morrill Act.

On February 8, 1853, the Illinois Legislature adopted a resolution, drafted by Turner, calling for the Illinois congressional delegation to work to enact a land-grant bill to fund a system of industrial colleges, one in each state. Senator Lyman Trumbull of Illinois believed it was advisable that the bill should be introduced by an eastern congressman, and two months later Representative Justin Smith Morrill of Vermont introduced his bill.

Unlike the Turner Plan, which provided an equal grant to each state, the Morrill bill allocated land based on the number of senators and representatives each state had in Congress. This was more advantageous to the more populous eastern states.

The Morrill Act was first proposed in 1857, and was passed by Congress in 1859, but it was vetoed by President James Buchanan. In 1861, Morrill resubmitted the act with the amendment that the proposed institutions would teach military tactics as well as engineering and agriculture. Aided by the secession of many states that did not support the plans, the reconfigured Morrill Act was signed into law by President Abraham Lincoln on July 2, 1862.

Land-grant colleges

The purpose of the land-grant colleges was:
 
without excluding other scientific and classical studies and including military tactic, to teach such branches of learning as are related to agriculture and the mechanic arts, in such manner as the legislatures of the States may respectively prescribe, in order to promote the liberal and practical education of the industrial classes in the several pursuits and professions in life.

From the early to mid-19th century the federal government, through 162 violence-backed cessions, expropriated approximately 10.7 million acres of land from 245 tribal nations and divided it into roughly 80,000 parcels for redistribution. Under the act, each eligible state received  of federal land, either within or contiguous to its boundaries, for each member of congress the state had as of the census of 1860. This land, or the proceeds from its sale, was to be used toward establishing and funding the educational institutions described above. Under provision six of the Act, "No State while in a condition of rebellion or insurrection against the government of the United States shall be entitled to the benefit of this act," in reference to the recent secession of several Southern states and the contemporaneously raging American Civil War. However, after the war, in the 1870s, Mississippi, Virginia, and South Carolina each assigned one African American college land grant status; these were, respectively, Alcorn University, Hampton Institute, and Claflin University.

In 1890 the 1862 Act was extended to the former Confederate states (see below for more detailed information), and it was eventually extended to every state and territory, including those created after 1862. If the federal land within a state was insufficient to meet that state's land grant, the state was issued scrip which authorized the state to select federal lands in other states to fund its institution. For example, New York carefully selected valuable timber land in Wisconsin to fund Cornell University. The resulting management of this scrip by the university yielded one third of the total grant revenues generated by all the states, even though New York received only one-tenth of the 1862 land grant. Overall, the 1862 Morrill Act allocated  of land, which when sold yielded a collective endowment of $7.55 million.

On September 12, 1862, the state of Iowa was the first to accept the terms of the Morrill Act which provided the funding boost needed for the fledgling State Agricultural College and Model Farm (eventually renamed Iowa State University of Science and Technology). The first land-grant institution actually created under the Act was Kansas State University, which was established on February 16, 1863, and opened on September 2, 1863.

The land grant colleges transformed engineering education in America and boosted the United States into a position of leader in technical education. Before the Civil War, American colleges primarily trained students in classical studies and the liberal arts. For the most part, only the relatively affluent could afford higher education, and entrance requirements often required proficiency in the dead languages of Latin and Greek. The first Bachelor of Science (B.S.) degrees, which typically required no Latin, came into being around 1850. American engineers were mostly educated at the United States Military Academy, on fortress construction, and their instructors were the authors of most engineering texts of the day. The Morrill Act changed all of that. Though the Congressional debates about the Act were largely focused on benefits to agriculture, the mechanic arts were specifically included in the Act's language, meaning applied sciences and engineering. The Act prohibited spending the endowment on constructing buildings as expensive and unnecessary, so instead the tools for engineering education increased, such as textbooks, laboratories and equipment. The number of engineers skyrocketed. Whereas in 1866 there were around 300 American men who had graduated with engineering degrees and only six reputable colleges granting them, just four years later there were 21 colleges offering engineering degrees and the total number of engineers graduated had tripled to 866. The following decade added another 2,249 engineers, and by 1911 the United States was graduating 3,000 engineers a year, with a total of 38,000 in the work force. At the time, Germany was graduating 1,800 engineers per year. The US had become the leader in technical education just 50 years after passage of the Morrill Act.

With a few exceptions (including Cornell University and the Massachusetts Institute of Technology), nearly all of the land-grant colleges are public.  (Cornell University, while private, administers several state-supported contract colleges that fulfill its public land-grant mission to the state of New York.)

To maintain their status as land-grant colleges, a number of programs are required to be maintained by the college. These include programs in agriculture and engineering, as well as a Reserve Officers' Training Corps program.

Expansion
The second Morrill Act (1890) was also aimed at the former Confederate states. This act required each state to show that race was not an admissions criterion, or else to designate a separate land-grant institution for African Americans. Thus, the second Morrill Act facilitated segregated education, although it also provided higher educational opportunities for African Americans who otherwise would not have had them.  Among the seventy colleges and universities which eventually evolved from the Morrill Acts are several of today's historically Black colleges and universities. Though the 1890 Act granted cash instead of land, it granted colleges under that act the same legal standing as the 1862 Act colleges; hence the term "land-grant college" properly applies to both groups.

Later on, other colleges such as the University of the District of Columbia and the "1994 land-grant colleges" for Native Americans were also awarded cash by Congress in lieu of land to achieve "land-grant" status.

In imitation of the land-grant colleges' focus on agricultural and mechanical research, Congress later established programs of sea grant colleges (aquatic research, in 1966), urban grant colleges (urban research, in 1985), space grant colleges (space research, in 1988), and sun grant colleges (sustainable energy research, in 2003).

Agricultural experiment stations and cooperative extension service
Starting in 1887, Congress also funded agricultural experiment stations and various categories of agricultural and veterinary research "under direction of" the land-grant universities.  Congress later recognized the need to disseminate the knowledge gained at the land-grant colleges to farmers and homemakers. The Smith–Lever Act of 1914 started federal funding of cooperative extension, with the land-grant universities' agents being sent to virtually every county of every state. In some states, the annual federal appropriations to the land-grant college under these laws exceed the current income from the original land grants. In the fiscal year 2006 USDA budget, $1.033 billion went to research and cooperative extension activities nationwide. For this purpose, then President George W. Bush proposed a $1.035 billion appropriation for fiscal year 2008.

See also
 Agricultural Experiment Stations Act of 1887
 Association of Public and Land-grant Universities
 Hatch Act of 1887
 Land-grant university
 List of land-grant universities
 Manual labor college
 Smith-Lever Act of 1914
 United States Department of Agriculture

Further reading
Zdzienicka Fanshe, Rosalie. 2020. "The Morrill Act as Racial Contract: Settler-Colonialism and U.S. Higher Education" EScholarship.org

Lee, Robert and Tristan Ahtone. 2020. "How They Did It: Exposing How U.S. Universities Profited From Indigenous Land" PulitzerCenter.org

Sorber, Nathan. 2018. Land-Grant Colleges and Popular Revolt: The Origins of the Morrill Act and the Reform of Higher Education. Cornell University Press.

Wallenstein, Peter. 2018. "The Morrill Land Grant College Act of 1862 : seedbed of the American system of public universities." Civil War Congress and the creation of modern America : a revolution on the home front. Ohio University Press. ISBN: 9780821423387

References

External links

 
  A radio documentary on the Morrill Land-Grant Acts.

1862 in American law
1862 in the United States
37th United States Congress

History of universities and colleges in the United States
United States federal agriculture legislation
United States federal public land legislation